TMAO reductase may refer to:

 Trimethylamine N-oxide reductase
 Trimethylamine-N-oxide reductase (cytochrome c)